Vera Valeryevna Sessina (born 23 February 1986) is a Russian individual rhythmic gymnast. She is the 2007 World All-around silver medalist, the 2006 European All-around Champion, two time (2006, 2005) Grand Prix Final All-around champion and three time (2008, 2007, 2003) Grand Prix Final All-around silver medalist. She was known for her high releve during her pivot.

Career 
Sessina began training in rhythmic gymnastics in 1993 and eventually moved to the Russian training center in Novogorsk. At the 2002 European Championships in Granada, she performed only one routine, but was noticed because of her flexibility, stability and clean performance. The same year, she took part in an international event in Thiais (France) and won some medals on various apparatus. In 2003, she performed well on the Grand Prix circuit.

In 2005, Sessina competed at the 2005 World Championships. She placed fifth in all-around qualifications but did not advance into the finals because teammates Olga Kapranova and Irina Tchachina placed ahead of her. She was also sent to the 2005 European Championships.

In 2006, Sessina won the all-around competition at the 2006 European Championships in Moscow, beating teammate and Olympic champion Alina Kabaeva. She won the 2006 Grand Prix Final all-around in Innsbruck and won three events of the FIG World Cup Final in Mie, Japan.

Sessina continued to do well in 2007, winning the all-around silver medal at the World Cup series in Ljubljana as well as silver in all-around at the 2007 Grand Prix Final. At the 2007 European Championships in Baku, she won the gold medal in clubs, a silver for rope, a pair of bronze medals for ribbon and hoop for the individual event finals. At the 2007 World Championships, Sessina won the all-around silver medal behind Ukrainian Anna Bessonova and then took the all-around bronze medal at the 2007 Summer Universiade behind Bessonova and Kapranova.

Sessina competed for a spot at the 2008 Olympics but struggled due to injury and was beaten by compatriots Evgenia Kanaeva and Olga Kapranova. She won a gold medal in rope and bronze in hoop at the 2008 World Cup Final in Benidorm and ended her season with silver in the all-around at the 2008 Grand Prix Final.

Sessina won silver medals in All-around, rope, hoop and ribbon at the 2009 European Championships held in Baku, Azerbaijan. She retired from competition following the event.

After her retirement, Sessina was elected to the FIG Athletes Commission as a rhythmic gymnastics representative.

Routine music information

References

External links
 
  

Russian rhythmic gymnasts
1986 births
Living people
Sportspeople from Yekaterinburg
Medalists at the Rhythmic Gymnastics World Championships
Medalists at the Rhythmic Gymnastics European Championships
World Games gold medalists
World Games silver medalists
World Games bronze medalists
Competitors at the 2005 World Games
Universiade medalists in gymnastics
Universiade silver medalists for Russia
Universiade bronze medalists for Russia